The 1973 Arizona State Sun Devils football team represented Arizona State University in the 1973 NCAA Division I football season and outscored its opponents 519 to 171.

Schedule

Roster

Season summary

Arizona

    
    
    
    
    
    
    
    
    
    
    
    

Arizona State clinches a share of WAC title and third straight trip to the Fiesta Bowl. Morris Owens went over 1,000 yards receiving for the season while both Woody Green and Benny Malone surpassed the same mark in rushing yardage.

NFL draft
Four Sun Devils were selected in the 1974 NFL Draft, which lasted seventeen rounds (442 selections).

^ Eley last played for ASU in 1971; he was in the Canadian Football League (1972–74) with the BC Lions.

Awards and honors
All-Americans: HB Woody Green - Consensus - Football Coaches of America, Sporting News, Time, UPI (second), AP (second), Walter Camp, QB Danny White - Football Writers, Time, UPI (second), AP (second), NEA
All-WAC: OT Steve Gunther, OG John Houser, QB/P Danny White, HB Woody Green, DE Sam Johnson, DE Larry Shorty, LB Bob Breunig, DB Mike Haynes, K Danny Kush (honorable mention), DB Bo Warren (honorable mention), DB Kory Schuknecht (honorable mention), RS Morris Owens (honorable mention), C Ed Kindig (honorable mention), DT Deke Ballard (honorable mention), DT Neal Skarin (honorable mention), MG Sal Olivo (honorable mention), LB James Baker (honorable mention)

References

Arizona State
Arizona State Sun Devils football seasons
Western Athletic Conference football champion seasons
Fiesta Bowl champion seasons
Arizona State Sun Devils football